Delaware elected its members October 7, 1816.

See also 
 United States House of Representatives elections, 1816 and 1817
 List of United States representatives from Delaware

Notes 

1816
Delaware
United States House of Representatives